Tabaqat (طبقات) is a genre of Islamic biographical literature that is organized according to the century in which the notable individuals (such as scholars, poets etc.) lived. Each century or generation is known as a Tabaqah, the plural of which is Tabaqat. The Tabaqat writings depict the past of a particular tradition of religious affiliation or scholarship and follows a chronological parameter that stretch from an authoritative starting-point to the generation (tabaqa) immediately preceding the assumed author.

Development 
The tabaqat literature originated sometime within the late eighth and ninth centuries. Another account also cited that the tabaqat format became popular during the period of early hadith transmitter critics, emerging amid the effort to identify, classify, and evaluate transmitters in the discipline known as ilm al-rijāl. The Tabaqat literature were written as tools to assist the muhaddiths in their efforts to classify hadith transmitters and to determine the quality of particular isnads. The isnad as a system for authenticating the memory of the prophetic period required righteous, honest, and competent transmitters in every generation. Biographical entries in the Tabaqat literature typically offer evaluations of the personal, religious and intellectual quality of their subjects.

Examples 
Famous examples of Tabaqat literature include Tabaqat al-Hanabilah originally by Ibn Abi Ya'la and then by Ibn Rajab. Tabaqat ul-Mutazilah (as the title suggests, concerned with Islamic theologians of the Mutazilite school) by Ahmad bin Yahya al-Murtada, at-Tabaqat ul-Kubra (about the companions of the Prophet and their successors) by Ibn Sa'd and - more recently - Tabaqat 'Alam ul-Shi'ah (about famous Shi'a scholars] by Aqa Buzurg Tehrani. The case of Ibrahim Hafsi's compendium of works, which are based on the Tabaqat historiographical framework, also demonstrate how the genre is applied in various fields in the Arabo-Islamic civilization and religious disciplines.

References

Literary genres
Islamic literature
Arabic literature
Islamic terminology